Shane Aguirre (born December 11, 1972) is an American accountant and Republican politician. He is a current member of the Mississippi House of Representatives, having represented the state's 17th House district since 2016.

Biography 
Shane Aguirre was born on December 11, 1972, in Tupelo, Mississippi. He has graduated from Mississippi State University and the University of Mississippi. He is an accountant. He has represented Mississippi's 17th House district, composed of a portion of Lee County, as a Republican in the Mississippi House of Representatives since January 2016. In 2020, he filed a House bill that would regulate liquor sampling events.

In 2020, Aguirre voted yes on the bill to change the Mississippi State Flag.

References 

1972 births
Living people
Republican Party members of the Mississippi House of Representatives
21st-century American politicians